Ralstonia syzygii is a species of bacteria in the family Burkholderiaceae . This bacterium is the plant pathogen responsible for Sumatra disease that affects the cloves (Syzygium) in Indonesia . It is transmitted by  Hemiptera insects of the spittle group (superfamily Cercopoidea).

This species is classified in the species complex Ralstonia solanacearum, which also includes certain Asian strains of R. solanacearum , a soil bacterium which infects many species of plants, and bacteria from the blood disease of banana (BDB). These three plant pathogenic bacteria are very closely related, despite significant differences biologically, and are grouped in the subgroup phylotype IV species complex Ralstonia solanacearum.

References

External links
Type strain of Ralstonia syzygii at BacDive -  the Bacterial Diversity Metadatabase

Burkholderiaceae
Bacteria described in 1990